This article lists players who have recently captained the Waterford county hurling team in the Munster Senior Hurling Championship and the All-Ireland Senior Hurling Championship. Until 2007, the captain was chosen from the club that had won the Waterford Senior Hurling Championship.

List of captains

References

Hurling
Waterford
+Captains